Priester may refer to:

People
Aquiles Priester (born 1971), Brazilian metal drummer
Julian Priester (born 1935), American jazz trombone player and composer
Karl-Heinz Priester (1913–1961), German far right political activist
Lee Priester (1903–1988), American track and field athlete, and Olympian
Mitchell Burgzorg (born 1987), Dutch footballer who uses Priester as his stage name for his rap music career

Other
Priester Building

See also
Priest
Priesterweg railway station
Priesterbäker See, lake in Müritz National Park, Mecklenburg-Vorpommern, Germany